Yvette Ngwevilo Rekangalt is a dynamic Gabonese businesswoman, bankruptcy lawyer (law administrator) for the court of Libreville, human rights leader. She worked for 25 years as a jurist in the oil and gas industry. She has been a member of the African Union's Economic, Social and Cultural Council representing Central Africa for three terms, as well as chairperson of the Infrastructure and Energy Committee. She ran for office during the 2009 Gabonese election before vanishing from the political scene after the results. She is still very active in business and social activities.

Education
She studied law at Université Paris 1 - Panthéon Sorbonne.

Early life
Yvette Ngwevilo Rekangalt comes from Enyonga, a village on the Ogooué river in Ogooué-Maritime Province. She comes from a very humble background and has lived in poverty which has made her a persistent businesswoman.

Her older brother, Martin Rekangalt, held a high ranking position in the Gabonese SENAT after his diplomatic career as ambassador in Belgium and head of the Gabonese mission to the European Commission.

Early career
She started her career in oil and gas with Elf (later became Total S.A.) in its headquarters in Paris. She was then muted to Port-Gentil before settling in the country's headquarter in Libreville. She stayed 22 years at Total Gabon, where she was in charge of oil and gas contracts, internal and external relations, before starting her consulting company.

Consultancy role
Yvette Ngwevilo played has been a support consultant for a number of local and international organizations such as the NEPAD World Bank, The International Heath Organization, The International Center for Trade and International Development

Current activities
Subsequent to starting her consulting firm, Yenore in Gabon and France, Yvette Ngwevilo Rekangalt was sworn in as bankruptcy trustee for the Law Court of Libreville on august 13th.

Associations 
 Member of the Interim Standing Committee (ECOSOCC) of the African Union.
 President of the National Planned Parenthood Federation
 Former President of the Economical, Cultural and Social Council
 Président of Sauvegarde de l'Enfance - SOS Mwana
 Nation and Regional Committee for Negotiations of the economical partnerships agreements member for seven years
 Steering committee member of the program Gabon 2025
 Served one term as the African Union's Economic, Social and Cultural Council member 
 Served three mandates at Gabonese National Economic, Social and Cultural Council
 Member of the African Women's Development and Communication Network
 Founding member of the Gabonese National Association of Women Lawyers

References

Economic, Social and Cultural Council Standing Committee members
Living people
Gabonese women in politics
21st-century women politicians
Human rights in Gabon
1956 births
21st-century Gabonese people